The 2004 SEAT Open was a women's tennis tournament played on indoor hard courts in Kockelscheuer, Luxembourg which was part of Tier III of the 2004 WTA Tour. It was the 9th edition of the tournament and was held from 25 October until 31 October 2004. Second-seeded Alicia Molik won the singles title and earned $35,000 first-prize money.

Finals

Singles

 Alicia Molik defeated  Dinara Safina, 6–3, 6–4
 This was Molik's 3rd singles title of the year and the 4th of her career.

Doubles

 Virginia Ruano Pascual /  Paola Suárez defeated  Jill Craybas /  Marlene Weingärtner, 6–1, 6–7(1–7), 6–3

References

External links
 ITF tournament edition details
 Tournament draws

SEAT Luxembourg Open
Luxembourg Open
2004 in Luxembourgian tennis